Plagal Grind is a 12" EP by New Zealand band Plagal Grind, released in 1990. Containing members of This Kind of Punishment and The 3Ds, along with Alastair Galbraith, the band was considered a supergroup.

Production
The EP was recorded at Fish Street Studios, in Dunedin, New Zealand.

Critical reception
Trouser Press called the EP "one of the high-water marks for New Zealand rock," writing that it "ups the sonic ante with richly textured electric guitars and loads of reverb, resulting in a shimmering, mystical sound perfectly suited to [Alastair] Galbraith-penned songs like 'Yes Jazz Cactus', 'Marquesite Lace' and the majestic 'Receivership'."

Track listing

Side A
"Vincent"    
"Midnight Blue Vision"    
"Receivership"    
"Yes Jazz Cactus"

Side B
"Marquesite Lace"    
"Starless Road"    
"Blackout"

Personnel
Robbie Muir (bass)
Peter Jefferies (drums)
Alastair Galbraith (guitar, vocals)
David Mitchell (guitar)

References

Alastair Galbraith (musician) albums
1990 EPs